Nenițescu is a Romanian surname. Notable people with the surname include:

Costin Nenițescu (1902–1970), Romanian chemist
Ioan S. Nenițescu (1854–1901), Romanian poet and playwright
Ștefan I. Nenițescu (1897–1979), Romanian poet and son of Ioan

Romanian-language surnames